A glossary (from , glossa; language, speech, wording) also known as a vocabulary or clavis, is an alphabetical list of terms in a particular domain of knowledge with the definitions for those terms. Traditionally, a glossary appears at the end of a book and includes terms within that book that are either newly introduced, uncommon, or specialized. While glossaries are most commonly associated with non-fiction books, in some cases, fiction novels sometimes include a glossary for unfamiliar terms.

A bilingual glossary is a list of terms in one language defined in a second language or glossed by synonyms (or at least near-synonyms) in another language.

In a general sense, a glossary contains explanations of concepts relevant to a certain field of study or action. In this sense, the term is related to the notion of ontology. Automatic methods have been also provided that transform a glossary into an ontology or a computational lexicon.

History
In medieval Europe, glossaries with equivalents for Latin words in vernacular or simpler Latin were in use, such as the Leiden Glossary (ca. 800 CE).

Core glossary 

A core glossary is a simple glossary or defining dictionary that enables definition of other concepts, especially for newcomers to a language or field of study. It contains a small working vocabulary and definitions for important or frequently encountered concepts, usually including idioms or metaphors useful in a culture.

Automatic extraction of glossaries 

Computational approaches to the automated extraction of glossaries from corpora or the Web have been developed in the recent years. These methods typically start from domain terminology and extract one or more glosses for each term of interest. Glosses can then be analyzed to extract hypernyms of the defined term and other lexical and semantic relations.

See also 
 Index (publishing)
 Terminology extraction
 Frahang-i Pahlavig, a glossary of Pahlavi logograms
Controlled vocabulary

References

External links 

 glossarist.com: The Glossarist - Large list of glossaries
 www.ontopia.net: The TAO of Topic Maps
 www.babel-linguistics.com: Babel Linguistics Glossaries Selected Multilingual Glossaries by Industry
  This provides a detailed description of the development of glossaries in classical languages.

 
Book design
Lexicography